Toad Lake is a lake in Toad Lake Township, Becker County, Minnesota, in the United States.

Toad Lake is the English translation of the Native American name.

References

Lakes of Minnesota
Lakes of Becker County, Minnesota